Crossoloricaria variegata is a species of armored catfish native to Panama where it is found in the Mamoní, Tuira and Yape River basins and Colombia where it is found in the San Juan and Sinú River basins.  This species grows to a length of  SL.

References

Burgess, W.E., 1989. An atlas of freshwater and marine catfishes. A preliminary survey of the Siluriformes. T.F.H. Publications, Inc., Neptune City, New Jersey (USA). 784 p. 

Loricariini
Fish of Panama
Freshwater fish of Colombia
Taxa named by Franz Steindachner
Fish described in 1879